Raoul Hunter (June 18, 1926 – December 10, 2018) was a Canadian sculptor and caricaturist.

Biography 

Born in Saint-Cyrille-de-Lessard, l'Islet, Quebec, Canada, Hunter studied at l’École des Beaux-Arts de Québec and at the École nationale supérieure des Beaux-Arts of Paris.

He was a caricaturist for Quebec City's Le Soleil from 1956 to 1989.

From 1989 he worked primarily as a sculptor.

Works 

 Mother Émilie Gamelin, 1999, at the Berri-UQAM station of the Montreal Metro.
 Statue of William Lyon Mackenzie King (1967), on Parliament Hill, Ottawa
  Monument to the memory of the Canadian merchant seamen from the province of Quebec who lost their lives at sea during World War II, Pointe-à-Carcy, Quebec, 2002.

Honours 

 Member since 1989 of the Order of Canada.

References 

1926 births
2018 deaths
Canadian sculptors
Canadian male sculptors
Montreal Metro artists
Members of the Order of Canada